Abangares is a canton in the Guanacaste province of Costa Rica. The head city is in Las Juntas district.

History 
Abangares was created on 4 June 1915 by decree 13.

Geography 
Abangares has an area of  km² and a mean elevation of  metres.
The canton begins on the coastline of the Gulf of Nicoya north of the mouth of the Abangares River. It widens between the Lajas River on the northwest and Lagartos River on the east as it reaches up into the Cordillera de Tilarán.

Districts 
The canton of Abangares is subdivided into the following districts:
 Las Juntas
 Sierra
 San Juan
 Colorado

Demographics 

For the 2011 census, Abangares had a population of  inhabitants.

Transportation

Road transportation 
The canton is covered by the following road routes:

Gold mines 
The Abangares canton is home to the oldest gold mining tradition in Costa Rica, dating back over a century.  The first major mining operation was Abangares Mining Company, founded in the Tilarán mountains by U.S. railroad, fruit, and shipping magnate Minor C. Keith.

One of the canton's major modern producers of gold, with silver as a by-product, has been the Tres Hermanos mine, which for many years was operated by El Valiente Ascari S.A., a subsidiary of Ariel Resources Ltd. of Vancouver, British Columbia, Canada. That company filed for insolvency in 2001 and abandoned the operation while still owing its workers two months worth of wages. More than 300 families continue to earn a meager living working through an independent local collective that now operates the mine.

A mining museum at La Sierra de Abangares with artifacts from the boom times of Costa Rican gold mining is a major tourist attraction of the canton.

References 

Cantons of Guanacaste Province
Populated places in Guanacaste Province